Bryan John Herta (born May 23, 1970) is an American former race car driver. He currently runs his own team, Bryan Herta Autosport in the NTT IndyCar Series. His team won the 2011 Indianapolis 500 with driver Dan Wheldon and the 2016 Indianapolis 500 with driver Alexander Rossi. He is the father of IndyCar Series driver Colton Herta.

Racing career

CART/Champ Cars/IndyCars

Herta enjoyed considerable success in the lower formulae, winning the Barber Formula Ford and Barber Saab Pro Series, and dominating the 1993 Indy Lights championship with Tasman Motorsports.

He graduated to IndyCar racing in 1994 with team owner A. J. Foyt, where he had several promising races before suffering a season-ending injury at Toronto.

In 1995, Herta was hired to drive for Chip Ganassi Racing. Despite a pole at Phoenix, the association was unsuccessful, with Herta managing only a 20th place in the series standings while his teammate Jimmy Vasser finished 8th. Even so, Herta landed a top ride with Team Rahal for the 1996 season.

During the next few years, Herta developed a reputation for his prowess on road courses, especially at Laguna Seca Raceway. In 1996, he was the leader until the last lap, when Alex Zanardi made the spectacular pass through the "Corkscrew" chicane and took the victory. Herta, who rarely qualified below the first row at Laguna Seca, finally won two events on the twisty road course in 1998 and 1999. At the height of Herta's career, fan interest in the Shell-sponsored driver was dubbed by team owner David Letterman as "Hertamania."

In the opening laps of the 1998 event at Elkhart Lake, Wisconsin's Road America circuit, Herta was involved in one of the scariest incidents in the history of North American motor racing. In the  road course's fifth turn, Herta got too close to the back of the car of co-owner Rahal, and spun out into a paved runoff area, facing oncoming traffic. A few seconds later, an ESPN camera that had zoomed in on Herta's head pulled back when Herta clenched his fists and put them against the sides of his head.  As course workers scattered, Alex Barron slid into the front of Herta's car and rode up on top of it. Both drivers were okay. Herta reported that Barron's car had actually hit his hands, only inches from his face.

From 2000 to 2003, Herta drove for a variety of Champ Car teams including Forsythe Championship Racing, Mo Nunn Racing, and PK Racing, but never quite regained his form from the late 1990s.  In 2002 Herta drove an F1 car for the first time, piloting a Minardi at the "Thunder in the Park" event held at Donington Park.  This led to speculation that he would test and even race for Minardi in F1, however this never happened.

IRL IndyCar Series 
After dabbling in sports cars, he revitalized his open-wheel racing career by substituting for an injured Dario Franchitti halfway through the 2003 IRL season.

In just his third IRL start, Herta picked up his first IndyCar Series win at Kansas Speedway for Andretti Green Racing. He was retained in an expanded four-car squad in 2004, usually running development engines. On July 31, 2005, Herta took his second IndyCar Series win, defeating AGR teammate Dan Wheldon in a close finish in the Firestone Indy 400 at the Michigan International Speedway.

In early 2006, he drove at Mazda Raceway Laguna Seca and Fundidora Park for A1 Team USA in the A1 Grand Prix series before returning to Andretti Green for the IRL season.

As of 2006, Herta has started in the Indianapolis 500 five times (1994–1995, 2004–2006) with three top ten finishes, including a best of 3rd in 2005. Bryan has his helmets painted by AliveDesignCo.com

Sports cars
On October 31, 2006, Herta was confirmed as a driver for Andretti Green Racing's new Acura Le Mans prototype program for the 2007 American Le Mans Series season.  He shared the car with Marino Franchitti, brother of his former teammate Dario Franchitti.  On January 3, 2007, it was announced that Dario would also drive a limited ALMS programme with both Marino and Herta.  Herta finished the season 7th in driver points with 1 class win. He also drove for A1 Team USA. At the event in Australia, Herta scored a 10th-place finish.

After racing
Since retiring from racing, Herta served as a driver coach for Vision Racing and founded a Firestone Indy Lights Series team named Bryan Herta Autosport, which has a technical alliance with Vision Racing's Indy Lights team. In 2009, the team fielded a full-time entry for Daniel Herrington.  The team campaigned Sebastián Saavedra for eleven races of the 2010 Firestone Indy Lights season and the Indianapolis 500. In 2011 the team fielded a car for Dan Wheldon in the 2011 Indianapolis 500 which resulted in a stunning victory, and a full-time entry in Indy Lights for Duarte Ferreira.

For the 2012 IZOD IndyCar Series season, Alex Tagliani ran the 500. The team switched to a Honda powered DW12 in May 2012 for the remainder of the season.

In 2016 Herta partnered with Michael Andretti as a co-owner and won the 2016 Indianapolis 500.  Their car was driven by series rookie Alexander Rossi.

Herta's son, Colton, is also a racing driver, and made his IndyCar debut in 2019 with Harding Steinbrenner Racing. In March 2019, Colton became the youngest ever IndyCar winner in the second round at the Circuit of the Americas.

Personal life
Herta has three children with his wife Janette, Calysta, Colton and Cade.

Career racing results

American Open Wheel
(key)

Indy Lights

CART results

CART career summary

2 wins, Best championship result: 8th

IndyCar Series results

IndyCar Series career summary

2 wins, best championship result: 8th

Indianapolis 500

Complete American Le Mans Series results

24 Hours of Le Mans results

Complete A1 Grand Prix results
(key) (Races in bold indicate pole position) (Races in italics indicate fastest lap)

References

External links
Herta's official site
Herta's profile from IndyCar.com
Bryan Herta Autosport's official site
Bryan Herta on A1 TEAM USA Official Site
Bryan Herta's helmet painter

1970 births
Living people
Racing drivers from Detroit
Racing drivers from Michigan
IndyCar Series drivers
Champ Car drivers
Indianapolis 500 drivers
Indy Lights champions
Indy Lights drivers
A1 Team USA drivers
Sportspeople from Warren, Michigan
24 Hours of Le Mans drivers
American Le Mans Series drivers
IndyCar Series team owners
Barber Pro Series drivers
Chip Ganassi Racing drivers
Andretti Autosport drivers
Mo Nunn Racing drivers
Rahal Letterman Lanigan Racing drivers
A. J. Foyt Enterprises drivers
Forsythe Racing drivers
A1 Grand Prix drivers
KV Racing Technology drivers
Tasman Motorsports drivers
Walker Racing drivers
David Price Racing drivers